The 2017 Skyrunner World Series was the 16th edition of the global skyrunning competition, Skyrunner World Series, organised by the International Skyrunning Federation from 2002. 

In this edition is deleted the Vertical Kilometer title, but returns the overall title (absent from 2012).

Sky Classic

Calendar

Men
Full results.

Women
Full results.

Sky Ultra

Calendar

Race by race.

Men
Full results.

Women
Full results.

Sky Extreme

Calendar

Men
Full results.

Women
Full results.

Overall

Men
Full results.

Women
Full results.

References

External links
 Skyrunner World Series

2017